James Edward Milner (3 February 1933 – October 2017) was an English professional footballer who played as an inside forward. He scored 30 goals from 166 appearances in the Football League playing for Burnley, Darlington and Tranmere Rovers, and a further 5 goals from 22 appearances for Accrington Stanley which were expunged from the player's record when the club resigned from the League mid-season. He also played non-league football for Blyth Spartans, Sankey's of Wellington and New Brighton.

Outside football, Milner worked as a mining engineer.

References

1933 births
2017 deaths
Footballers from Newcastle upon Tyne
English footballers
Association football inside forwards
Blyth Spartans A.F.C. players
Burnley F.C. players
Darlington F.C. players
Accrington Stanley F.C. (1891) players
Tranmere Rovers F.C. players
GKN Sankey F.C. players
New Brighton A.F.C. players
English Football League players